William Bennett ( – 7 November 1857) was a British born Methodist minister of whom little is known before 1800.

Bennett became known to history when the British Wesleyan Conference  sent him as a missionary to Nova Scotia. His work as a missionary in Nova Scotia and New Brunswick was important to the development of the Methodist Church in the Maritimes.

References 
 Biography at the Dictionary of Canadian Biography Online
 British North American Wesleyan Methodist Magazine (1840-41) Vol. 1

Canadian Methodist ministers
1770s births
1857 deaths